V354 Cephei is a red supergiant star located within the Milky Way. It is an irregular variable located over 8,900 light-years away from the Sun. If it were placed in the center of the Solar System, it would extend to between the orbits of Mars and Jupiter.

Identification
V354 Cephei is identified as a red supergiant variable star and included on surveys such as IRAS and 2MASS, but prior to its inclusion in the General Catalogue of Variable Stars in 1981, it was referred to only by its listings on relatively obscure catalogs.  It is too faint to be included in catalogs such as the Henry Draper Catalogue or Bonner Durchmusterung. It was included on a 1947 Dearborn Observatory survey as star 41575, but that ID is hardly ever used.

V354 Cephei has been referred to as Case 75. This is from one of several listings of cool stars made using the Burrell Schmidt telescope at the Warner and Swasey Observatory of Case Western Reserve University, although Case 75 is mistakenly identified as the nearby F3V star BD+58°2450.  The carbon star AT Persei is listed as star 75 in another of the survey papers and is also known as Case 75.  The SIMBAD astronomical portal prefers to restrict that usage to AT Persei and has devised a different unique acronym for V354 Cephei.

Distance

V354 Cephei is near the Cepheus OB1 stellar association and considered a likely member. This association is at a distance of between 2,750 and 3,500 parsecs, but currently thought to be at 3,400 parsecs based on reliable Gaia Data Release 2 parallaxes of neighbouring OB stars. Both Gaia results carry significant statistical margin of error, as well as indicators that the astrometric excess noise is far beyond acceptable levels so that the parallax should be considered unreliable.

Properties

The properties of V354 Cephei are disputed, but the star is classed as a cool supergiant star with a spectral and luminosity class given as M2.5 Iab, indicating it is an intermediate-size luminous supergiant, but was later given as M3.5 Ib, indicating it is rather a less luminous supergiant.

Newer calculations of the luminosity of V354 Cep determined the luminosity of the star to be somewhat much lower, below , which implies much smaller sizes below .  A 2011 study notes the discrepancy but is unable to explain it.  There are similar differences in the visual extinctions derived, between two and six magnitudes.  Other more recent published data assumes the smaller Gaia distance, and hence derives lower luminosities.

Notes

References

External links 
Space.Com
Universe Today

M-type supergiants
Slow irregular variables
Cepheus (constellation)
Cephei, V354
J22333464+5853470
IRAS catalogue objects